Austin Krajicek and Rajeev Ram were the defending champions, but chose to compete in Stockholm and Antwerp, respectively, instead.

Marcelo Demoliner and Matwé Middelkoop won the title, defeating Simone Bolelli and Andrés Molteni in the final,  6–1, 6–2.

Seeds

Draw

Draw

References
 Main Draw

Kremlin Cup - Men's Doubles
2019 Doubles